Forty Little Mothers is a 1940 American comedy-drama film directed by Busby Berkeley and starring Eddie Cantor.

Plot
Out-of-work professor Gilbert Jordan Thompson stops a suicidal stranger named Marian Edwards from jumping off a pier and helps her get a job so she can support herself. Then, he finds an abandoned baby with a note asking someone to give him a good home. When he cannot find anyone to claim the baby, Gilbert "adopts" him so he will not end up in an orphanage.

Meanwhile, the baby's mother, Marian, arrives a few minutes too late to reclaim her son, and frantically tries to find him, not knowing that the man who saved her life is taking care of her child.

Soon Gilbert gets a teaching job with live-in quarters at an all-girls school that does not allow teachers to have families. This forces him to hide the baby, whom he calls "Chum". The students harass the professor and try one scheme after another to get him fired because they are angry at him for replacing the heartthrob professor they loved.

When the girls discover Chum and hear his story, they become his "forty little mothers" and fight for the privilege of taking care of him, also deciding that the professor is not so bad after all.

After staff members see the girls making baby clothes and assume the worst, they alert the strict, no-nonsense headmistress, who finds Chum and fires Professor Thompson for breaking the rules. The girls stage a mutiny and barricade themselves in their dormitory, vowing that they will not come out until the professor gets his job back. The professor talks sense into them and prepares to leave, not knowing that Marian has shown up and reclaimed her son.

Because she thinks Professor Thompson is the husband who deserted Marian and her baby, the headmistress tries to turn his students against him by bringing the mother and child to the classroom to tell them about it. However, the professor comes in before she can tell them the story, and Marian and he recognize each other.

Marian explains that she had to give up her baby after being deserted by her husband, and Thompson explains that he took the baby in. He says the baby had the "best care in the world and the love of forty little mothers." Marian thanks the girls for taking such good care of her baby. The professor walks outside and Marian follows so he can say goodbye to Chum. As the professor is leaving the campus, the remorseful headmistress, with all the students in tow, gives him his job back.

Cast

In addition, uncredited players include Joe Yule, Adrienne D'Ambricourt, Esther Dale, Veronica Lake, Selmer Jackson and Virginia Sale

Production
The "Granville Girls" students seen here include many of MGM's starlets of the time, including an unbilled Veronica Lake and the deadpan singer Virginia O'Brien.

See also
 Forty Little Mothers (1936)
 Cento piccole mamme (1952)

References

External links

 
 
 
 

1940 films
Films directed by Busby Berkeley
Metro-Goldwyn-Mayer films
Films produced by Harry Rapf
Films scored by Georgie Stoll
American remakes of French films
American black-and-white films
1940 drama films
American drama films
1940s English-language films
1940s American films